Parental Advisory is a message affixed by the Recording Industry Association of America (RIAA) to audio recordings in the United States. 

Parental Advisory may also refer to:

 "Parental Advisory" (song), by Jay Rock, 2014
 Parental Advisory: Explicit Lyrics (album), a 1990 comedy album by George Carlin
 P.A. (group), an American hip-hop trio

See also
 Warning: Parental Advisory, a 2002 American television film